Julius Cooley Michaelson (January 25, 1922 – November 12, 2011) served as Rhode Island Attorney General from 1975 to 1979 and was the Democratic U.S. Senate nominee in 1982 against liberal Republican John Chafee.

Michaelson was born to Carl and Celia (née Cooley) Michaelson. He entered the U.S. Army in 1943 as a Private and was released in 1946 as a First Lieutenant. He graduated from Boston University in 1947, having earned his law degree. He received a Master's degree from Brown University in 1967.  His public service career began in 1957 as public counsel in public utility rate cases. In 1962, Michaelson was elected to the State Senate and served there until 1974. He was Deputy Majority Leader during the 1969 session.

In 1974, he won the State Attorney General election and left office after two terms. He challenged incumbent Republican U.S. Senator John Chafee in 1982, garnering 49% to Chafee's 51%.

He died on November 12, 2011. At the order of Rhode Island Governor Lincoln Chafee, son of  former Senator John Chafee, state flags were flown at half-staff in his memory.

References

1922 births
2011 deaths
Politicians from Providence, Rhode Island
United States Army officers
United States Army personnel of World War II
Brown University alumni
Jewish American people in Rhode Island politics
Democratic Party Rhode Island state senators
Rhode Island Attorneys General
21st-century American Jews